World Flora Online is an Internet-based compendium of the world's plant species.

Description
The World Flora Online (WFO) is an open-access database, launched In October 2012 as a follow-up project to The Plant List, with the aim of publishing an online flora of all known plants by 2020. It is a project of the United Nations Convention on Biological Diversity, with goal of halting the loss of plant species worldwide by 2020. It is developed by a collaborative group of institutions around the world in response to the 2011–2020 Global Strategy for Plant Conservation (GSPC)'s updated Target 1: to produce "an online flora of all known plants".

An accessible flora of all known plant species was considered a fundamental requirement for plant conservation. It provides a baseline for the achievement and monitoring of other targets of the strategy. The previous target of GSPC was achieved in 2010 with The Plant List. WFO was conceived in 2012 by an initial group of four institutions; the Missouri Botanical Garden, the New York Botanical Garden, the Royal Botanic Garden Edinburgh and the Royal Botanic Gardens, Kew. In all, 36 institutions are involved in the production.

References

Bibliography

, see also The Plant List

.
Databases in the United Kingdom
Databases in the United States
Missouri Botanical Garden
Online botany databases
Online taxonomy databases
Plant taxonomy
Royal Botanic Gardens, Kew